The N4 road is one of the national highways of Gabon. It is located to the north-east of the country.

Towns located along the highway include:

Viate
Ekonlong
Makokou
Mékambo

National highways in Gabon